Anilios broomi, also known commonly as Broom's blind snake, the faint-striped blind snake, and the striate blind snake, is a species of non-venomous snake in the family Typhlopidae. The species is endemic to Australia.

Geographic range
A. broomi is found in northeastern Queensland, Australia.

Habitat
The preferred habitats  of A. broomi are woodland, mallee, and arid and semi-arid areas.

Reproduction
A. broomi is oviparous.

Etymology
The specific name, broomi, is in honor of paleontologist Robert Broom.

References

Further reading
Boulenger GA (1898). "Descriptions of Two new Snakes from Queensland". Annals and Magazine of Natural History, Seventh Series 2: 414. (Typhlops broomi, new species).
Cogger HG (2014). Reptiles and Amphibians of Australia, Seventh Edition. Clayton, Victoria, Australia: CSIRO Publishing. xxx + 1,033 pp. . (Ramphotyphlops broomi, p. 798).
Hedges SB, Marion AB, Lipp KM, Marin J, Vidal N (2014). "A taxonomic framework for typhlopid snakes from the Caribbean and other regions (Reptilia, Squamata)". Caribbean Herpetology (49): 1-61. (Anilios broomi, new combination).
Wilson S, Swan G (2013). A Complete Guide to Reptiles of Australia, Fourth Edition. Sydney: New Holland Publishers. 522 pp. .

broomi
Reptiles described in 1898
Snakes of Australia